Kakuru is a genus of theropod dinosaur from the early Cretaceous Period.

The only described species, Kakuru kujani, is known primarily from evidence of a single tibia, which had been fossilised through a rare process in which the bone through hydration turned to opal. The bone was dug up at the opal fields of Andamooka, South Australia. The opalised tibia was exhibited by a gem shop in 1973 and by chance brought to the attention of paleontologist Neville Pledge. The owner at the time, a certain A. Fleming, allowed pictures and two casts to be made but eventually the specimen was sold at an auction to an anonymous buyer. It was presumed lost to science. In 2004, however, the South Australian Museum succeeded in procuring the fossil for $22,000.

Kakuru was formally named in 1980 by Pledge and Ralph Molnar. The type species is Kakuru kujani. The generic name is that of a Rainbow Serpent of Australian Aboriginal mythology. The specific name is that of the local aboriginal tribe, the Kujani or Guyani.

One of the casts is the plastoholotype, SAM P17926. The specimen was discovered in the marine Bulldog Shale of the Marree Subgroup, dating to the Aptian. Apart from the tibia, the find included some small probable fibula fragments. Later a foot digit was referred that might have come from the same species, specimen SAM P18010, but the assignment is dubious. The tibia is broken into about ten larger pieces and roughly 33 centimetres long. It is very slender in build and shows the impression of the ascending process of the astragalus, an ankle bone itself lost. The process seems to have been very long and narrow.

Kakuru is believed to have been carnivorous, was bipedal and about two to three meters in length. This small dinosaur seems to have had long, slender legs.

Due to the paucity of the remains it has been difficult to establish the phylogenetic position of Kakuru. Molnar and Pledge gave no more precise determination than a Theropoda incertae sedis. The tibia provides two indications: its gracile form and the tall height and narrow width of the astragalar process. Both seems to point to the Coelurosauria, perhaps the Oviraptorosauria. However, in 2005 Oliver Rauhut pointed out that the Abelisauroidea also have a high ascending process of the astragalus.

References

External links
 Kakuru kujani on Alphalink.com.au by Molnar and Pledge, 1980.
 The Theropod Database on Kakuru

Prehistoric maniraptorans
Aptian life
Early Cretaceous dinosaurs of Australia
Paleontology in South Australia
Fossil taxa described in 1980
Taxa named by Ralph Molnar